Emeritus (female: emerita) is an adjective used to designate a retired chair, professor, pastor, bishop, pope, director, president, prime minister, rabbi, emperor, or other person who has been "permitted to retain as an honorary title the rank of the last office held".

In some cases, the term is conferred automatically upon all persons who retire at a given rank, but in others, it remains a mark of distinguished service awarded selectively on retirement. It is also used when a person of distinction in a profession retires or hands over the position, enabling their former rank to be retained in their title, e.g., "professor emeritus". The term emeritus does not necessarily signify that a person has relinquished all the duties of their former position, and they may continue to exercise some of them.

In the description of deceased professors emeriti listed at U.S. universities, the title emeritus is replaced by indicating the years of their appointments except in obituaries, where it may indicate their status at the time of death.

Etymology 
The word is attested since the early 17th century with the meaning "having served out one's time, having done sufficient service." The Latin feminine equivalent, emerita, is also sometimes used, although in English the word emeritus is often unmarked for gender.

In academia

In the United States and other countries, a tenured full professor who retires from an educational institution in good standing may be given the title "professor emeritus". The title "professor emerita" is sometimes used for women. In most systems and institutions, the rank is bestowed on all professors who have retired in good standing, while at others, it needs a special act or vote. Professors emeriti may, depending on local circumstances, retain office space or other privileges. The adjective may be placed before or after the title, e.g., "professor emeritus" or "emeritus professor".

Other uses

When a diocesan bishop or auxiliary bishop retires, the word emeritus is added to their former title, i.e., "Archbishop Emeritus of ...". The term "Bishop Emeritus" of a particular see can apply to several people, if the first lives long enough. The title was applied to the Bishop of Rome, Pope Emeritus Benedict XVI, on his retirement. In Community of Christ, the status of emeritus is occasionally granted to senior officials upon retirement.
In Judaism, emeritus is often a title granted to long-serving rabbis of synagogues or other Jewish institutions.  In some cases, the title is also granted to chazzans.  Rabbi Emeritus or Cantor Emeritus is largely an honorific title.  

Since 2001, the honorary title of president pro tempore emeritus has been given to a senator of the minority party who has previously served as president pro tempore of the United States Senate.

It is also used in business and nonprofit organizations to denote perpetual status of the founder of an organization or individuals who made significant contributions to the institution.

Following her decision to retire from Democratic leadership, the House Steering and Policy Committee voted to grant Nancy Pelosi the title of "speaker emerita" in recognition of her service as Speaker of the House.

See also 
Taishang Huang (retired Emperors of Imperial China)
President pro tempore emeritus of the United States Senate
Daijō Tennō (retired Emperors of Japan)
Diocesan bishop (bishop emeritus in the Catholic Church)
Pope Emeritus
List of academic ranks

Notes

References

Sources
 Emeritus, New Oxford American Dictionary (2nd edition), 2005.
 Emeritus, Australian Concise Oxford Dictionary (3rd edition), 1997.

Social titles
Academic terminology
Academic honours
Suffixes